James Hugh Felts (February 1, 1866–January 12, 1932) was an American newspaper editor and politician.

Felts was born in Williamson County, Illinois. He went to the Williamson County schools and then lived in Marion, Illinois with his wife. Felts was the editor and publishers of the Marion Evening Post and the Illinois Baptist' newspapers. He was also involved in the banking business. Felts served as a Marion City Commissioner for the finance department and on the Marion Board of Education. Felts was a Democrat. He served in the Illinois House of Representatives from 1915 to 1919 and in the Illinois Senate from 1929 until his death in 1932. Felts died at his home in Marion, Illinois after suffering from a long illness.

Notes

External links

1866 births
1932 deaths
People from Marion, Illinois
Businesspeople from Illinois
Editors of Illinois newspapers
Illinois city council members
School board members in Illinois
Democratic Party members of the Illinois House of Representatives
Democratic Party Illinois state senators